Debbie Lynn Rothstein (born June 12, 1956), also known as Debbie Papenbrook, is an American voice actress and the producer and creator of the award-winning theatre company for young audiences, A Faery Hunt. She is the widow of Bob Papenbrook and the mother of Bryce Papenbrook.

Career
Debbie worked as a professional actress and behind–the–scenes in the entertainment industry for over 40 years. After receiving her BFA in musical theater in 1977, Debbie worked mostly as a full–time stage actress in theaters throughout Central and Southern California, along with roles with major motion picture studios and behind-the-scenes with executives on films. Some notable associates are Steven Spielberg, John Frankenheimer, Universal Studios, Columbia TriStar, Zoetrope, Avenue Pictures, HBO, Paramount, to name a few. Her work in voiceover in children's cartoons, anime, dubbing and children's theater is extensive. In 2004, she created the highly successful interactive theater A Faery Hunt.  Almost weekly, the winner of the Nickelodeon's Parents' Pick Award for "Best Children's Theater in Los Angeles," named “Best of Hollywood” by the Hollywood Reporter, “Best of LA” by LA Parent and Los Angeles magazine, A Faery Hunt takes children and their families on an interactive, musical theatrical experience.   The shows take place in forests, parks, gardens and other outdoor spaces in Southern California.  A few times a year A Faery Hunt comes indoors at the Sunset Theatre Company in Redondo Beach.  A Faery Hunt shows create Fairyland by weaving their faery magic with original stories, dancing and songs that  inspire the best in all of us.  The tales carry simple life-messages including kindness, forgiveness, respect for nature, keeping a positive attitude, love for one another and to have fun. Debbie writes, directs, composes, arranges and acts in all of the original shows that are performed for A Faery Hunt.

Filmography

Anime
 Mon Colle Knights – Spectra the Angel
 The Big O – Additional Voices
 Trigun -

Movie
 1941 – USO Girl (Jitterbugger)
 Ah! My Goddess: The Movie – Additional Voices 
 Alvin and the Chipmunks Meet the Wolfman – Additional Voices

Video game
 Lords of EverQuest – Additional Voices
 Might and Magic IX -

External links

A Faery Hunt Webpage

American television actresses
American voice actresses
21st-century American composers
American women writers
American producers
Living people
20th-century American Jews
1956 births
Actresses from Minnesota
People from Anoka County, Minnesota
21st-century American actresses
21st-century American Jews
20th-century American women